WCTP (88.5 FM, "Christian Radio 88.5") is a radio station broadcasting a Southern Gospel music format. Licensed to Gagetown, Michigan, it first began broadcasting in 2006 under the WPEE call sign.

The station was assigned the WCTP call letters by the Federal Communications Commission on December 28, 2006.

References

Sources 
Michiguide.com - WCTP History

External links

Southern Gospel radio stations in the United States
Radio stations established in 2006
Tuscola County, Michigan
CTP